Absolute block signalling is a British signalling scheme designed to ensure the safe operation of a railway by allowing only one train to occupy a defined section of track (block) at a time. This system is used on double or multiple lines where use of each line is assigned a direction of travel.

A train approaching a section is offered by a signalman to his counterpart at the next signal box. If the section is clear, the latter accepts the train, and the first signalman may clear his signals to give permission for the train to enter the section. This communication traditionally takes place by bell codes and status indications transmitted over a simple telegraph wire circuit between signalmen using a device called a block instrument, although some contemporary block working is operated wirelessly. This process is repeated for every block section a train passes through. The absolute block system does not replace the use of any other form of signalling, such as fixed signals, hand signals, or detonators – and, in fact, usually relies on fixed signals.

Prior to the introduction of block systems, time intervals were used to keep trains sufficiently far apart; typically if five minutes had passed since the first train had departed then a second train was allowed to proceed; although the driver was warned that there was a train only five minutes ahead. This was insufficient to prevent a train colliding with the rear of one that had stopped unexpectedly.

Block section 
In absolute block working, a block section (or simply section) is a section of railway line between one signal box and another – in the typical absolute block, lines are paired, with an up – towards London (or in Scotland, Edinburgh) – and a down line in the opposite direction. The signal box towards which a train travels is said to be in advance and the signal box from which it travels is said to be in rear. A block section is normally the section of track from the most advanced signal controlled by the signal box in rear, and the rearmost signal controlled by the signal box in advance. Because many signal boxes are at stations, the last signal controlled by the rear box is called the starter signal, whether or not there is a station at which trains stop. This signal, and the rearmost signal controlled by the box ahead, are stop signals, which a train should not pass if they are in the on position, showing a red light. The first stop signal controlled by a box is called the home signal.  A distant signal is also provided some distance from the home signal, which will only show a clear aspect if all stop signals under a signal box's control are clear, and will otherwise show caution – this gives a driver advance warning of a need to stop.

Intermediate block section 
Some signal boxes have an intermediate block section, or IBS. This normally takes the place of an old absolute block section, and is commonly found where former absolute block sections and their associated signal boxes have been removed. Essentially an intermediate block section allows two block sections, and therefore two trains, to be on the same line but controlled by the same signal box.

Typically, a signal box with an intermediate block section will have a home signal (and associated distant signal), starting signal and an intermediate block home signal which has its own distant signal. The line from the starting signal to the intermediate block home signal is called the intermediate block home section.  The line from the intermediate block home signal to the home signal of the next signal box on the same line in the same direction of travel is the absolute block section. To clear the intermediate block home signal a "line clear" is required from the signal box in advance.

An intermediate block section means that a train can approach the intermediate block home signal while there is a train between the intermediate block home signal and the home signal of the next signal box on the same line in the same direction of travel. Generally, all intermediate block home signals and their respective distants are colour light signals, normally showing two aspects.

Station limits 
The extent of the line from the rearmost home signal to the most advanced starting signal controlled from the same signal box is called station limits at that signal box (this does not necessarily refer to a passenger station). Within station limits, the signalman controls the safe movement, and in normal circumstances he can directly see the position of trains there. Usually no communication with other signalmen is needed for movements within station limits.

Railway telegraphy 

Electrical telegraphy was the first practical use of current electricity and was developed in the 1840s and 1850s at the same time as the development of railways. 
The first commercial electrical telegraph was the Cooke and Wheatstone system. In July 1837 William Fothergill Cooke installed a demonstration system on the Euston to Camden Town section of Robert Stephenson's London and Birmingham Railway for signalling rope-hauling of carriages (as the locomotives could not cope with the steep incline).

In 1842 he published these ideas in a book entitled Telegraphic Railways: Or The Single Way Recommended By Safety, Economy, And Efficiency, Under The Safeguard And Control Of The Electric Telegraph.
Cooke’s ideas were not taken up by the railway companies until the 1850s and 1860s. When they were developed into a practical system, it provided the ability for signalmen to communicate with each other and provided the basis for the absolute block system. By 1872 it was used on 44% of lines in Britain, rising to 75% by the end of the decade and was made mandatory on passenger-carrying lines in 1889. It successfully managed train control over most of the British railway system until generally superseded by more sophisticated systems from 1950.

Block instruments 

Block instruments are located in signal boxes. They show the state of the block sections before and after the signal box. Originally the different displays and commutator handle were in a variety of cabinets. The standard British Railways block instrument brought them together in a single small cabinet; its front face displaying two indicators, a commutator handle, a bell and a tapper. The upper indicator shows the state of the forward block – along the line leading away from the signal box. The commutator is used by the signalman to indicate the state of his block, and the lower indicator displays this state, which is also displayed on a repeater indicator in the box for the block from which a train will come. At the bottom is a single-stroke bell and the tapper to sound the bell in the next box. The commutator and each of the two indicators has three positions: normal (or line blocked), line clear, and train on line. In the simplest case of a signal box serving a two-track section, there will be two block instruments, one for communicating with each of the neighbouring boxes.

In a simple double line configuration, where the signal boxes are A, B and C in succession in the up direction, the signal box at B will have two block instruments, one for communicating with box A for trains on the up line and one for box C for down trains. The block instrument for communicating with box A will be used to receive on the bell a request from box A to take an up train. The other block instrument will do the same for box C for a down train. The commutator and lower display on the two instruments relate to the up line and the down line respectively. The upper display is a repeater from the signal box of the block ahead.

Signalling bell 

The signalling bell, also known as a block bell, is used in conjunction with the block instruments if the bell is not integrated with them. It is a single stroke design that is used to communicate from one signal box to an adjacent one. Each bell has its own distinctive sound so that the signalman knows which box is communicating with him.

There are a set of standard bell codes. Each communication starts with a single strike of the bell meaning “Call attention”. The recipient signalman then shows that he has received the message by repeating it back to the sender. All subsequent bell messages are acknowledged promptly by repeating back to the sender – with the single exception of six strikes which indicate “Obstruction danger” which is not echoed back until all relevant signals have been set to “Stop”.

Example block-bell exchange 

An example is the process of signalling a train in the up direction (from A to C) past a signal box B. The signal box in rear is A and the signal box in advance is C. The block indicators at B are in the Normal position. The signalman at A "offers" the train to B by sending an "Is Line Clear?" code on the block bell; for example to offer an express passenger train, he sends four beats consecutively; an ordinary passenger train is offered by sending three beats, and after a pause one more beat, usually written as 3-1. If the signalman at B can accept the train safely (if there is no other train in the section, and the line is clear up to B's clearing point) he "accepts" the train by repeating the bell signal, and placing the commutator on his block instrument for the section from A to "Line Clear". The "Line Clear" is repeated at box A, and allows the signalman at A to clear, or "pull off", his signals. In case the line is not clear, B simply does not acknowledge A's "Is Line Clear?", and leaves the commutator in the Normal position.

At this point, B will not clear any of his signals. Firstly, he cannot clear his starting signal without a "Line Clear" from C. As a result, B will not clear his home signal – he can only clear it when he either has a clear run through (which he does not have without a "Line Clear" from C), or is confident that the train will be able to stop at his starting (or section) signal (this is not done until the train is in view and visibly under control). Finally, his distant will not clear without both his home and starting signals being clear.

As the train passes the starting signal at A, the signalman there sends the "Train Entering Section" signal (2 beats) on the block bell to B, and the signalman at B acknowledges the signal and moves the commutator to "Train On Line". His lower indicator on the block indicator to A repeats the position of the commutator.

B immediately offers the train on to C, after calling for attention, by sending the "Is Line Clear?" bell signal (repeating the same steps A had done while offering the train to B); if C accepts it he repeats the bell signal and places his block indicator to "Line Clear", which moves the position of the upper needle indicator in B's block instrument to repeat that indication. B may now clear his signals for the train.

After an interval, the train will arrive and pass B; as it does so, B sends "Train Entering Section" on the block bell to C. Then C acknowledges the bell signal and places the block instrument to "Train On Line". As the train passes, he restores his signals to danger, and when the whole of the train passes B complete with tail lamp attached, B sends the "Train Out Of Section" bell signal (2-1) to A and when A acknowledges it, he places his block indicator to "Normal". The block section between A and B is now normal and A can offer B another train, if he has one.

When the train has reached C, the signalman there sends "Train Out Of Section" on the block bell and when B acknowledges it, C places the block indicator to "Normal".

Bell codes 
Bell codes are used to communicate with adjacent signal boxes. They can communicate information regarding the type of train being offered, the status of trains within sections or emergency information. A bell code is acknowledged as being understood by repetition.

Nearly all bell codes are preceded by a single stroke on the bell, referred to as Call Attention — the main exception being Train Entering Section. The Is Line Clear? bell signal describes the train, distinguishing between ordinary and express passenger trains, and various categories of goods train. In some locations, routing information is included in the bell code, such an ordinary passenger train to be routed to a branch at the signal box in advance would be offered by the bell code 1-3 instead of 3-1. These often vary by location.

Train classification
All trains, whether operated by a (passenger) train operating company (TOC) or a freight operating company (FOC), are allocated to one of ten classes, as set out below. It is a generalized guide intended to assist signalling staff in prioritizing trains according to their importance as well as ensuring that any special instructions that may apply at a specific location are carried out. Passenger trains are generally classified in accordance with their stopping pattern while the classification of freight trains depends upon maximum permitted speeds. Class 1 trains (together with Class 9 services, which are officially their equivalent in this regard) have the highest priority, followed by Class 2 and then so on down the list.

Supplemental codes 
These codes are supplemented by codes either side, to show the status of the train within the section or the section itself:

See also 
 
 Heritage railway
 Rule 55

References

Sources 
 
 
 
 

Railway signalling block systems
Railway signalling in the United Kingdom